Amerton is a small village in the Borough of Stafford, Staffordshire, England, situated on the A518 road between Stafford and  Uttoxeter. The population details for the 2011 census can be found under Stowe-by-Chartley. You can visit Amerton Farm, Amerton Railway and the British Wildlife Rescue Centre

External links 
 
 

Villages in Staffordshire